Harriet 'Hattie' Ngaire Shand (born 11 January 2000) is a field hockey player from Australia, who plays as a defender.

Personal life
Hattie Shand was born in Naracoorte, South Australia and grew up in Langkoop, Victoria, at the age of two she was diagnosed with autism. She attended Naracoorte Primary School and Naracoorte High School, she currently studies part-time at the University of Adelaide.

Career

Achievements
Shand is a scholarship holder at the South Australian Sports Institute.

In 2021, she was awarded a Tier 3 Scholarship from the Sport Australia Hall of Fame.

Club hockey
Shand plays club hockey in South Australia's top level domestic competition, the Premier League. She is a member of the Adelaide Hockey Club.

Domestic hockey
In Hockey Australia's domestic competitions, Shand plays for her home state, South Australia. From 2017–2018, she was a member of the SA Suns team in the Australian Hockey League (AHL).

Following the dissolution of the AHL, Shand was named in the newly formed Adelaide Fire team for Hockey Australia's new premier competition, the Sultana Bran Hockey One. She went on to represent the team in the inaugural season in 2019, helping the team to a third place finish.

International hockey

Under–21
In 2018, Shand made her debut for the Australia U–21 team during a test series against New Zealand in Hastings.

She followed this up with appearances during a Tri-Nations Tournament in 2019, as well as a test series against Japan in 2020, both held in Canberra.

References

External links
 
 

2000 births
Living people
Australian female field hockey players
Female field hockey defenders
21st-century Australian women